Austrochaperina pluvialis, also known as the rain frog, white-browed chirper, flecked land frog, or whitebrowed whistle frog, is a species of frog in the family Microhylidae. It is endemic to northeastern Queensland, Australia.

Habitat and conservation
They are usually found beneath fallen timber and leaf litter. Males call from beneath leaves on the forest floor. Eggs are deposited terrestrially and have direct development, hatching as fully formed froglets.

Austrochaperina pluvialis is an infrequently seen species that appears patchily distributed because of difficulty of encountering it. In the past it has been threatened by habitat loss caused by logging. At present, development for tourism could represent a localized threat.

References

pluvialis
Frogs of Australia
Amphibians of Queensland
Endemic fauna of Australia
Amphibians described in 1965
Taxa named by Richard G. Zweifel
Taxonomy articles created by Polbot